K-64 was a nuclear-powered Soviet submarine, head ship of its class.

Fate
In 1972, the submarine suffered a major reactor problem in the form of a leak of liquid metal coolant.  The superheated metal solidified on contact with the colder outside air, freezing and damaging internal components of the reactor. The submarine was removed from service and towed to Severodvinsk.  At the dockyard, the damage to the reactor was deemed too extensive for repair and the decision was made to salvage as much as they could.  K-64 was split in half, its bow section (including control spaces) was taken to Leningrad and used for training new Soviet submariners.

References

Ships built in the Soviet Union
Cold War submarines of the Soviet Union
Maritime incidents in 1972
1972 in the Soviet Union
Ships built by Sevmash